= First Jersey Credit Union =

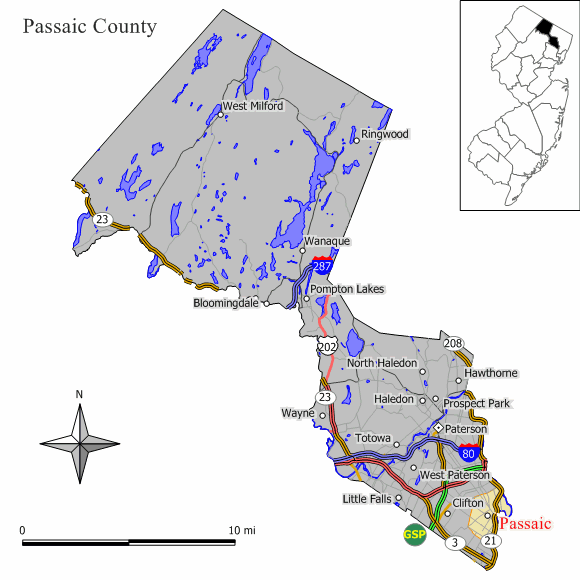
- Map of Passaic in Passaic County
- Company type: Credit union
- Industry: Financial services
- Founded: 1929
- Headquarters: Passaic County, New Jersey, United States
- Products: Savings; checking; consumer loans; mortgages; credit cards; investments; online banking
- Website: firstjerseycu.com

First Jersey Credit Union was a federally insured, state chartered credit union operating from two branches in Passaic County, New Jersey. It was involuntarily liquidated by the New Jersey Department of Banking and Insurance and the National Credit Union Association on February 28, 2018, and USAlliance Federal Credit Union absorbed the majority of FJCU's assets.

== History ==
First Jersey was originally chartered in 1929. The credit union converted from a multi-SEG credit union to a community credit union on 18 April 2005. They were a credit union involved with financing taxi medallions.
